Nina Viktorovna Shtanski (born 10 April 1977, in Tiraspol, Moldavian SSR, USSR) is a Transnistrian former state politician and public figure. She has been the Deputy Prime Minister for the International Cooperation of the Transnistrian Moldovan Republic and the Minister of Foreign Affairs of the Transnistrian Moldovan Republic from 24 January 2012 to 2 September 2015. Ph.D. (2012). She became an honoured foreign service officer Transnistrian Moldovan Republic in 2012. She held the rank of Ambassador Extraordinary and Plenipotentiary.

Biography 
She was born 10 April 1977 in the city of Tiraspol, Moldavian SSR. She graduated from the Faculty of Law of the Transdniestrian State University. TG Shevchenko. Shtanski has spoken about being of Polish descent.
24 December 2012 she defended her thesis for the degree of Candidate of Political Sciences on the theme "Problems of the conflict in Transnistria / Moldova: International Aspects" (Research consultants - Prof. Marina Lebedeva, and Associate Prof. S.S. Veselovskii).

From 2002 to 2009 she worked at the Supreme Council of the Transnistrian Moldovan Republic in the following positions:
Leading specialist staff of the Supreme Soviet of the PMR
Assistant to the Chairman of the Supreme Council
Political Advisor to the Chairman of the Supreme Council.

From 2009 to 2011, involved in social and educational activities, is an adviser to Evgeny Shevchuk - at that time a deputy of the Supreme Soviet of Transnistria and the President of the social movement "Renaissance." She has taught at the Institute of History, State and Law of the Transdniestrian State University. TG Shevchenko Tiraspol and inter-university.

30 December 2011, after the inauguration of the President of TMR EV Shevchuk, appointed a special representative of the President of the TMR in the negotiating process, interaction with the diplomatic missions and international organizations.

24 January  2012 appointed Minister of Foreign Affairs of the unrecognized Dniester Moldavian Republic.

1 February 2012 by the Decree of the President of the TMR was charged a special representative of the President of the TMR in the negotiating process, interaction with the diplomatic missions and international organizations.

6 November 2012 by the Decree of the President of Transnistria Yevgeny Shevchuk appointed Deputy Prime Minister of the PMR for international cooperation, while maintaining the current position of Minister of Foreign Affairs of the PMR.

She voiced her support to the 2014 annexation of Crimea by the Russian Federation and asked Russia to do the same with Transnistria.

A member of the Security Council under the President of the Transnistrian Moldovan Republic.

Nina Shtanski gave up her government position in  September 2015 when she married Yevgeny Shevchuk, the President of Transnistria.

References

External links 
Биография на сайте МИД ПМР
Биография на сайте Президента ПМР
Эксклюзивное интервью Министра иностранных дел ПМР Н.В.Штански программе «Наблюдатель»
Министр иностранных дел Приднестровской Молдавской Республики Нина Штански дала интервью GTimes

1977 births
Female foreign ministers
Foreign ministers of Transnistria
Living people
People from Tiraspol
Women government ministers of Transnistria
Spouses of national leaders of states with limited recognition
Transnistrian people of Moldovan descent
Transnistrian people of Polish descent
21st-century Moldovan women politicians